KFOK-LP (95.1 FM) is a radio station licensed to Georgetown, California, United States. The station is currently owned by American River Folk Society.

See also
List of community radio stations in the United States

References

External links
 

FOK-LP
Community radio stations in the United States
FOK-LP